Jellyfish dermatitis is a cutaneous condition caused by stings from a jellyfish.

See also 
 List of cutaneous conditions
 Skin condition
 Stingray injury

References

External links

Parasitic infestations, stings, and bites of the skin
Invertebrate attacks